Daria Marchenko (born  1982) is a Ukrainian artist who has worked with bullet shells from the War in Donbas in eastern Ukraine. In 2015, Marchenko created in her studio in Kiev a portrait called "The Face of War" of Russian President Vladimir Putin, made up with 5,000 bullet casings from the conflict. The portrait was presented along with a novel with the personal stories of six people involved with the project, including Daria's own story, and of the people who helped her collect the cartridges at the front.

Personal life 
Marchenko has had a boyfriend who was an active member in the Euromaidan movement and helped her get the first shells for the portrait of "The Face of War".

References 

Living people
1980s births
Year of birth uncertain
Ukrainian women artists
Pro-Ukrainian people of the war in Donbas